Umnum is a village in Tanah Rubu district, Manokwari Regency in West Papua province, Indonesia. Its population is 152.

Climate
Umnum has a cold subtropical highland climate (Cfb) with heavy rainfall year-round.

References

Populated places in West Papua